Kamrupi or Kamarupi may refer to:

 Kamarupi Prakrit, a middle Indo-Aryan language (5th-12th century)
 Kamrupi dialect, a modern dialect of Assamese
 Kamarupi script, ancestral script of Assamese and Bengali
 Kamrupi people, native speakers of Kamrupi language
 Kamrupi Brahmins
 Kamrupi Dholiya

See also 
 Kamrupi crafts, handicrafts from Kamrup
 Kamrupi culture, culture of Kamrup
 Kamrupi dance, dances from Kamrup
 Kamrupi Lokgeet, folk songs in Kamrupi dialect
 Kamrupi literature, literature from Kamrup

Language and nationality disambiguation pages